USCGC Basswood (WLB-388) was an  belonging to the United States Coast Guard launched on 20 May 1943, and commissioned on 12 January 1944.

Design
The Iris-class buoy tenders were constructed after the Mesquite-class buoy tenders. She was powered by one electric motor. This was connected up to two Westinghouse generators which were driven by two Cooper-Bessemer GND-8 four-cycle diesel engines. She had a single screw.

The ship had a complement of six officers and seventy-four crew members in 1945; this decreased to two warrants, four officers, and forty-seven men in 1966. They were fitted with a SL1 radar system and QBE-3A sonar system in 1945. Their armament consisted of one 3"/50 caliber gun, two 20 mm/80 guns, two Mousetraps, two depth charge tracks, and four Y-guns in 1945; these were removed in 1966.

Operational history

Basswood was laid down in Duluth, Minnesota, and commissioned in January 1944. From March to April 1944, she performed general ATON and icebreaking on the Great Lakes after which she was transferred to Astoria, Oregon, for additional ATON duty until the end of World War II.

In the 1950s Basswood made several trips to the Marshall Islands in support of US nuclear weapons testing there, specifically for Operations Greenhouse (1951), Castle (1954), and Redwing (1956).<ref name="Clarkson1983">{{cite techreport |first=P. W. |last=Clarkson, (Maj. Gen., USA) |url=https://www.osti.gov/opennet/servlets/purl/16060296.pdf |format=pdf |title=History of Operation Castle (extracted version) |orig-year=First published Spring 1954 |publication-place=Washington DC |number=39825 |institution=Defense Nuclear Agency |website=U.S. Department of Energy Office of Scientific and Technical Information |date=1 June 1983 |page=76 |url-status=live |access-date=16 May 2020 |archive-url=https://web.archive.org/web/20180818115159/https://www.osti.gov/opennet/servlets/purl/16060296.pdf |archive-format=PDF |archive-date=18 August 2018}}</ref> Forty-three nuclear weapons tests occurred at Enewetak Atoll in the Marshalls from 1948 to 1958.

She returned to the Marshalls in 1966, carrying Dayle Husted of the Smithsonian Institution to Enewetak as part of the Pacific Ocean Biological Survey Program. Basswood spent two days anchored in the lagoon there while Husted conducted his survey.Basswood completed three deployments to Vietnam during the Vietnam War. Consequently, personnel who served aboard her during one of these deployments are "eligible for the presumption of Agent Orange herbicide exposure" by the Department of Veterans Affairs.

From 1968 until her decommissioning in 1998, Basswood was stationed in Guam, and holds the distinction of being commissioned longer than any other naval ship assigned there. While based in Guam, she was the driving force behind Project Handclasp, a US Navy program to provide health care and humanitarian relief to outlying islands in the Pacific Ocean.

In 1976, the eye of Typhoon Pamela passed over Guam causing widespread, major damage. In Apra Harbor, Basswood's home port, ten ships or tugs were sunk or forced aground, as were numerous smaller vessels. However, Basswood successfully rode out the storm at anchor, recording a peak wind gust of 120 knots/hour (138 mph) and a minimum barometric pressure of 933.1 mb (27.6 inHg).

On July 1, 1997, Basswood began pursuit of the fishing vessel Cao Yu No. 6025. The Cao Yu was sighted by a Canadian Air Force P-3 crew on June 26 about 1,500 miles northwest of Midway Island apparently engaged in illegal driftnet fishing. US Coast Guard and Navy aircraft surveilled the ship before it was intercepted by Basswood, which followed the fishing vessel for some 1,500 miles. Contrary to the master's claims, the People's Republic of China denied that the vessel was registered there and, therefore, the Coast Guard determined that it was flagless and subject to boarding. The Cao Yu "aggressively" resisted but crew from Basswood and the USCGC Chase nevertheless boarded the Cao Yu on July 10 near the Japanese island of Kyushu and seized a 120-ton catch of mostly albacore tuna along with illegal driftnets. The Cao Yu's crew was taken aboard the Chase and transported to Guam. Basswood towed the Cao Yu to Guam where it was sold at auction, the ship's master was prosecuted for resisting the Coast Guard boarding.

Awards and decorations
The Basswood'' was awarded the Coast Guard Unit Commendation with the Operational Distinguishing Device three times. She earned the Meritorious Unit Commendation with the Operational Distinguishing Device four times. She was awarded six Coast Guard "E" Ribbons for her performance during Refresher Training with U.S. Navy Fleet Training Group (FTG) Pearl Harbor (1984, 1993, & 1995) and FTG West Pac (Subic) in 1986, 1988, and 1990. She also earned the Vietnam Service Medal three times and the Republic of Vietnam Campaign Medal for deployments in 1967, 1971, and 1972. Other distinctions received include the Bicentennial Unit Commendation, American Campaign Medal, World War II Victory Medal, National Defense Service Medal (3 awards), and Humanitarian Service Medal (2 awards).

See also
 List of United States Coast Guard cutters

References

Explanatory notes

Sources

External links

1943 ships
Cold War auxiliary ships of the United States
Historic American Engineering Record in Guam
Iris-class seagoing buoy tenders
Ships built in Duluth, Minnesota
Vietnam War auxiliary ships of the United States